Betanecrovirus is a genus of viruses, in the family Tombusviridae. Plants serve as natural hosts. There are three species in this genus.

Taxonomy
The genus contains the following species:
 Beet black scorch virus
 Leek white stripe virus
 Tobacco necrosis virus D

Structure
Viruses in Betanecrovirus are non-enveloped, with icosahedral and spherical geometries, and T=3 symmetry. The diameter is around 28 nm in diameter. Genomes are linear, around 4kb in length.

Life cycle
Viral replication is cytoplasmic. Entry into the host cell is achieved by penetration into the host cell. Replication follows the positive stranded RNA virus replication model. Positive stranded RNA virus transcription, using the premature termination model of subgenomic RNA transcription is the method of transcription. The virus exits the host cell by tubule-guided viral movement. Plants serve as the natural host. Transmission routes are mechanical, seed borne, and contact.

References

External links
 Viralzone: Betanecrovirus
 ICTV

Tombusviridae
Virus genera